Juan Feld (22 June 1923 – February 2008) was a Venezuelan sailor. He competed in the Star event at the 1964 Summer Olympics.

References

External links
 

1923 births
2008 deaths
Venezuelan male sailors (sport)
Olympic sailors of Venezuela
Sailors at the 1964 Summer Olympics – Star
Place of birth missing
20th-century Venezuelan people
21st-century Venezuelan people